Hasima Khatun is a Nepalese politician who is elected member of Provincial Assembly of Madhesh Province from CPN(Unified Socialist). Khatun is a resident of Brindaban, Rautahat.

References

External links

Living people
Members of the Provincial Assembly of Madhesh Province
People from Rautahat District
Communist Party of Nepal (Unified Socialist) politicians
Year of birth missing (living people)